A two-line element set (TLE) is a data format encoding a list of orbital elements of an Earth-orbiting object for a given point in time, the epoch. Using a suitable prediction formula, the state (position and velocity) at any point in the past or future can be estimated to some accuracy. The TLE data representation is specific to the simplified perturbations models (SGP, SGP4, SDP4, SGP8 and SDP8), so any algorithm using a TLE as a data source must implement one of the SGP models to correctly compute the state at a time of interest. TLEs can describe the trajectories only of Earth-orbiting objects. TLEs are widely used as input for projecting the future orbital tracks of space debris for purposes of characterizing "future debris events to support risk analysis, close approach analysis, collision avoidance maneuvering" and forensic analysis.

The format was originally intended for punched cards, encoding a set of elements on two standard 80-column cards. This format was eventually replaced by text files as punch card systems became obsolete, with each set of elements written to two 69-column ASCII lines preceded by a title line. The United States Space Force tracks all detectable objects in Earth orbit, creating a corresponding TLE for each object, and makes publicly available TLEs for many of the space objects on the website Space Track, holding back or obfuscating data on many military or classified objects.  The TLE format is a de facto standard for distribution of an Earth-orbiting object's orbital elements.

A TLE set may include a title line preceding the element data, so each listing may take up three lines in the file. The title is not required, as each data line includes a unique object identifier code.

History
In the early 1960s, Max Lane developed mathematical models for predicting the locations of satellites based on a minimal set of data elements. His first paper on the topic, published in 1965, introduced the Analytical Drag Theory, which concerned itself primarily with the effects of drag caused by a spherically symmetric non-rotating atmosphere. Joined by K. Cranford, the two published an improved model in 1969 that added various harmonic effects due to Earth-Moon-Sun interactions and various other inputs.

Lane's models were widely used by the military and NASA starting in the late 1960s. The improved version became the standard model for NORAD in the early 1970s, which ultimately led to the creation of the TLE format. At the time there were two formats designed for punch cards, an "internal format" that used three cards encoding complete details for the satellite (including name and other data), and the two card "transmission format" that listed only those elements that were subject to change. The latter saved on cards and produced smaller decks when updating the databases.

Cranford continued to work on the modelling, eventually leading Lane to publish Spacetrack Report #2 detailing the Air Force General Perturbation theory, or AFGP4. The paper also described two simplified versions of the system, IGP4 which used a simplified drag model, and SGP4 (Simplified General Perturbations) which used IGP4's drag model along with a simplified gravity model. The differences between the three models were slight for most objects. One year later, Spacetrack Report #3 was released, included full FORTRAN source code for the SGP4 model. This quickly became the de facto standard model, both in the industry as well as the astronomy field.

Shortly after the publication of Report #3, NASA began posting elements for a variety of visible and other well known objects in their periodic NASA Prediction Bulletins, which consisted of the transmission format data in printed form. After trying for some time to convince NASA to release these in electronic form, T.S. Kelso took matters into his own hands and began manually copying the listings into text files which he distributed through his CelesTrak bulletin board system. This revealed a problem in NASA's checksum system, which traced back to the lack of the plus character (+) on the teletype machines used at NASA, which ultimately turned out to be a problem from the punch card era that occurred when NORAD updated from the BCD to EBCDIC character set on the computer sending out the updates. This problem went away when Kelso began to receive data directly from NORAD in 1989.

The SGP4 model was later extended with corrections for deep space objects, creating SDP4, which used the same TLE input data. Over the years a number of more advanced prediction models have been created, but these have not seen widespread use. This is due to the TLE not containing the additional information needed by some of these formats, which makes it difficult to find the elements needed to take advantages of the improved model. More subtly, the TLE data is massaged in a fashion to improve the results when used with the SGP series models, which may cause the predictions of other models to be less accurate than SGP when used with common TLEs. The only new model to see widespread use is SGP8/SDP8, which were designed to use the same data inputs and are relatively minor corrections to the SGP4 model.

Format
Originally there were two data formats used with the SGP models, one containing complete details on the object known as the "internal format", and a second known as the "transmission format" that was used to provide updates to that data.

The internal format used three 80-column punch cards. Each card started with a card number, 1, 2 or 3, and ended with the letter "G". For this reason, the system was often known as the "G-card format". In addition to the orbital elements, the G-card included various flags like the launching country and orbit type (geostationary, etc.), calculated values like the perigee altitude and visual magnitude, and a 38-character comments field.

The transmission format is essentially a cut-down version of the G-card format, removing any data that is not subject to change on a regular basis, or data that can be calculated using other values. For instance, the perigee altitude from the G-card is not included as this can be calculated from the other elements. What remains is the set of data needed to update the original G-card data as additional measurements are made. The data is fit into 69 columns and does not include a trailing character. TLEs are simply the transmission format data rendered as ASCII text.

An example TLE for the International Space Station:
 ISS (ZARYA)
 1 25544U 98067A   08264.51782528 -.00002182  00000-0 -11606-4 0  2927
 2 25544  51.6416 247.4627 0006703 130.5360 325.0288 15.72125391563537

The meaning of this data is as follows:

Title line

Line 1

Line 2

Where decimal points are assumed, they are leading decimal points. The last two symbols in Fields 10 and 11 of the first line give powers of 10 to apply to the preceding decimal. Thus, for example, Field 11 (-11606-4) translates to −0.11606E−4 (−0.11606×10−4).

The checksums for each line are calculated by adding all numerical digits on that line, including the line number. One is added to the checksum for each negative sign (-) on that line. All other non-digit characters are ignored.

For a body in a typical low Earth orbit, the accuracy that can be obtained with the SGP4 orbit model is on the order of 1 km within a few days of the epoch of the element set. The term "low orbit" may refer to either the altitude (minimal or global) or orbital period of the body. Historically, the SGP algorithms defines low orbit as an orbit of less-than 225 minutes.

Two-digit Epoch Years from 57 to 99 correspond to 1957-1999 and those from 00 to 56 correspond to 2000–2056.

The maximum number of Satellite Catalog Numbers that can be encoded in a TLE is rapidly being approached with the recent commercialization of space and several key break-up events that have created a massive number of debris objects. Future adaptations of the TLE have been imagined to extend the number of encodable Satellites within the TLE.

References

Spaceflight concepts
Orbits
Computer file formats

de:Satellitenbahnelement#Das Two Line Elements Format TLE